Read & Burn 02 is an EP by English rock band Wire. It is the second in a series of three Read & Burn EPs. It was released on 1 October 2002.

Track listing

Personnel 

 David Coppenhall – design
 Denis Blackham – mastering
 Colin Newman – mixing
 Graham Lewis – photography

References

External links 

 
 

2002 EPs
Wire (band) EPs